Gwyneth Hughes is a British documentary director and screenwriter who works mainly in television.

Early life
She is a former newspaper journalist from the north of England.

Career
Her credits include the crime drama Five Days, Cherished, a film about the wrongful conviction of Angela Cannings, an adaptation of Charles Dickens's unfinished work The Mystery of Edwin Drood, and The Girl, which explores an alleged obsession Alfred Hitchcock had with the actress Tippi Hedren. Her work on Five Days earned her a nomination at the 2008 Golden Globe Awards. In 2013 she wrote Remember Me, which debuted on the BBC in November 2014.

In 2018, she executive-produced and adapted William Makepeace Thackeray's novel Vanity Fair into a 7-part television mini-series for ITV and Amazon Studios. She adapted the Henry Fielding Tom Jones novel for the Tom Jones (miniseries) to be broadcast on PBS in 2023.

References

External links

British documentary film directors
British film directors
British women screenwriters
British women film directors
British journalists
British television directors
British television producers
British women television producers
British television writers
Living people
Year of birth missing (living people)
Women documentary filmmakers
British women television writers
British women television directors